Van Beuren is a Dutch surname. The word van is equivalent to the English "of" and the German von, hence it usually is not capitalized in names. The similar name, Buren, is a city or estate in the Netherlands which was ruled by the Egmond family. Dutch nobles were commonly named after their possessions. Literally translated, the Dutch word  means "neighbours". The surname van Buren that sometimes is used by the Dutch royal house, is related. 

The name van Beuren may refer to:

Amadee J. van Beuren (1880–1938), American film producer
Van Beuren Studios, American animation studio
Frederick T. van Beuren, Jr. (1876–1943), American physician, surgeon, educator, and writer
Hope Hill van Beuren, American billionaire
John Mohlman van Beuren, American founder of Quan-Tech Laboratories, Inc. and owner two homes built by Bauhaus architects (Bertrand Goldberg and Ludwig Mies van der Rohe)
Michael van Beuren, American Bauhaus designer of furniture

See also

 Beuren (disambiguation)
 
 
 Van Buren (surname)
 Van Buuren (surname)

Dutch-language surnames
Surnames of Dutch origin